Zhang Jingfu or Zhang Jinfu (6 June 1914 – 31 July 2015) was a politician of the People's Republic of China. He served as Governor and Communist Party Secretary of Anhui province, Minister of Finance, and State Councilor of the 5th and 6th State Councils.

Zhang was an alternate member of the 8th Central Committee of the Chinese Communist Party, a member of the 11th and 12th Central Committees, a member of the 3rd and 4th Standing Committee of the CPPCC National Committee, and a Standing Committee of the Central Advisory Commission.

Biography
Zhang was born Zhang Shide into a family of farming background in Feidong County, Anhui, on June 6, 1914. In 1930, he attended Nanjing Xiaozhuang School, which was founded by Tao Xingzhi, a noted Chinese educator. He became an editor in Life Education in 1931. In the winter of 1932, he was a teacher, and then president of Dachangshan Haigong School.

He joined the Chinese Communist Party in December 1935 and worked in Shanghai. In 1937, after the outbreak of Second Sino-Japanese War, Shanghai was occupied by the Japanese army, he retreated to Wuhan, capital of Hubei province.

Zhang was appointed as the head of the Propaganda Department of Anhui provincial government in April 1938. One year later, he became the deputy director of Political Department of Jiangbei headquarters of the New Fourth Army. In January 1940, he was Communist Party Secretary of Jinpuludong province, and concurrently served as director of Political Department of Fifth detachment of the New Fourth Army. A year later, he became the deputy director of Political Department of Second division of the New Fourth Army. In February 1942, he served as a political commissar of Fourth Brigade of Second division of the New Fourth Army, and concurrently served as head of the Propaganda Department of Huainan.

After the founding of the People's Republic of China in 1949, he was appointed as Vice-Mayor and Deputy Communist Party Secretary of Hangzhou, capital of Zhejiang province.

In 1956, he became the Vice-President of the Chinese Academy of Sciences, serving as an assistant of President Guo Moruo.

In January 1975 he was promoted to become the Finance Minister of China, a position he held until August 1979. In 1980, he served as Governor and Communist Party Secretary of Anhui province, replacing Wan Li. In 1982, he was promoted to director of the State Economic Commission and State Councilor of China.

Zhang was elected a Standing Committee of the Central Advisory Commission at the 13th National Congress of the Chinese Communist Party.

Zhang died in Beijing on July 31, 2015. Zhang's body was cremated on August 6, 2015. China's seven senior leaders attended the funeral at Babaoshan Revolutionary Cemetery in west Beijing.

Personal life
Zhang married Hu Xiaofeng, they had two sons, Zhang Bohai and Zhang Mao. Zhang Mao, who is married to the daughter of the former Vice Premier Gu Mu, serves as Minister of the State Administration for Industry and Commerce.

References

1914 births
2015 deaths
Politicians from Hefei
Chinese Communist Party politicians from Anhui
People's Republic of China politicians from Anhui
Ministers of Finance of the People's Republic of China
Chinese centenarians
Men centenarians
State councillors of China